Nuestra Casa A La Izquierda Del Tiempo (Our Home On The Left Side Of Time) is a compilation album by La Oreja de Van Gogh. It was released on 220 October 2009, only one year after the release of the band's previous recording, A las cinco en el Astoria. It contains new versions of some of the band's biggest hits from its previous five albums, including tracks originally sung by former band-member Amaia Montero. All songs were re-recorded by the group to include Leire Martínez, who had recently been introduced as the band's new singer. The Bratislava Symphony Orchestra provided further musical accompaniment, giving a more acoustic and orchestral feel to the original songs.

The album also included the song "Loa Loa" ("Sleep, Sleep"), a traditional lullaby in Basque performed a cappella. It is the only track in the album that had never been released before by La Oreja de Van Gogh. Despite this and the fact that all tracks were recorded for the album in a studio, Nuestra casa a la izquierda del tiempo is not considered a studio album. Instead, the band usually refers to it as a "compilation album in which the whole group could experiment and play with the songs", mostly producing "acoustic versions" of the songs that they were "more confident with".

Tracks

References 

2009 albums
La Oreja de Van Gogh albums